Charles William Middleton (8 February 1910–1984) was a footballer who played in the Football League for Hartlepools United.

Career
Middleton was born in West Stanley and began his career with Walker Celtic before moving to Stoke City in the 1934–35 season. He left at the end of the campaign without breaking into the first team and he returned to the North East with West Stanley. He played one Football League match for Hartlepools United in the 1936–37 campaign which came in a 2–0 defeat away at Halifax Town on 12 September 1936.

Career statistics
Source:

References

English footballers
1910 births
1984 deaths
Association football forwards
English Football League players
Stoke City F.C. players
Walker Celtic F.C. players
West Stanley F.C. players
Hartlepool United F.C. players
People from South Moor
Footballers from County Durham